The VI Cavalry Corps ( literally: Higher Cavalry Command 6) was a formation of the German Army in World War I.

VI Cavalry Corps 
During the Courland Offensive a wide gap opened between the Army of the Niemen and 10th Army.  Set up by the 10th Army as a temporary Cavalry Corps. Established 18 August 1915. Redesignated 20 November 1916 as 59th Corps (z.b.V.).

59th Corps 
59th Corps (z.b.V.) was formed on 20 November 1916 by the redesignation of VI Cavalry Corps.  As the need for large mounted cavalry formations diminished as the war went on, the existing Cavalry Corps increasingly took on the characteristics of a normal Corps Command.  This culminated in them being redesignated as "General Commands for Special Use" Generalkommandos zur besonderen Verwendung (Genkdo z.b.V.).

By the end of the war, the Corps was serving on the Western Front as part of Armee-Abteilung A with the following composition:
 96th Division
 21st Landwehr Division
 75th Reserve Division

Commanders 
VI Cavalry Corps / 59th Corps had the following commanders during its existence:

See also 

German Army (German Empire)
German Army order of battle, Western Front (1918)
German cavalry in World War I

References

Bibliography 
 
 

Corps of Germany in World War I
Cavalry corps of Germany
Military units and formations established in 1915
Military units and formations disestablished in 1919

de:Höheres Kavallerie-Kommando